Polysiphonous describes an algal branch with axial cells each surrounded by cells of the same length as the axial cells.

See also
Monosiphonous algae

References

Algae
Seaweeds